Alex Wolfgang Wifler (born ) is an American male compound archer and part of the national team. As a junior, he won the silver medal at the 2013 World Archery Youth Championships in the team compound event. He participated in the team event and individual event at the 2015 World Archery Championships in Copenhagen. He is the winner of The Vegas Shoot 2015 He won the 2016 Lancaster Classic during the blizzard Jonas.

References

1994 births
Living people
American male archers
Place of birth missing (living people)